Ganamurti (pronounced gānamūrti, meaning the idol of music) is a ragam in Carnatic music (musical scale of South Indian classical music). It is the 3rd Melakarta rāgam in the 72 melakarta rāgam system of Carnatic music.

It is called Gānasāmavarāḷi in Muthuswami Dikshitar school of Carnatic music.

Structure and Lakshana

It is the 3rd rāgam in the 1st chakra Indu. The mnemonic name is Indu-Go. The mnemonic phrase is sa ra ga ma pa dha nu. Its  structure (ascending and descending scale) is as follows (see swaras in Carnatic music for details on below notation and terms):
: 
: 

The notes used in this scale are shuddha rishabham, shuddha gandharam, shuddha madhyamam, shuddha dhaivatham, kakali nishadham.

As it is a melakarta rāgam, by definition it is a sampoorna rāgam (has all seven notes in ascending and descending scale). It is the shuddha madhyamam equivalent of Jhalavarali, which is the 39th melakarta.

Asampurna Melakarta 
Gānasāmavarāḷi is the 3rd Melakarta in the original list compiled by Venkatamakhin. The notes used in the scale are the same, but the ascending scale is different. It is a shadava-sampurna raga (6 notes in ascending scale, while full 7 are used in descending scale).
: 
:

Janya rāgams 
Ganamurti has a few minor janya rāgams (derived scales) associated with it. See List of janya rāgams for full list of rāgams associated with Ganamoorti.

Compositions
Gānamoorthe sri krishna by Thyagaraja is a popular composition sung in concerts, set to Ganamurti.
Pāhi Jagadİswarā by Dr. M. Balamuralikrishna in Ādi Tala
Brihadiswara rakshatuma in Eka tala by Muthuswami Dikshitar is a composition set to Gānasāmavarāḷi scale.
Palaya Govinda in Ādi tala is a bhajan composed by Sri Ganapathi Sachchidananda Swamiji.

Related rāgams
This section covers the theoretical and scientific aspect of this rāgam.

Ganamurti's notes when shifted using Graha bhedam, yields 2 other melakarta rāgams, namely, Vishwambari and Shamalangi. Graha bhedam is the step taken in keeping the relative note frequencies same, while shifting the shadjam to the next note in the rāgam. For further details and an illustration refer Graha bhedam on Ganamurti.

Notes

References

Melakarta ragas